Kerala Sahitya Akademi Fellowship is an honour of the Kerala Sahitya Akademi (Kerala Literary Academy), given to writers of Malayalam literature by inducting them as the distinguished members of the Akademi.

References

External links 
 
 
 
 
 

Awards established in 1970
Kerala Sahitya Akademi Awards
Kerala Sahitya Akademi
Malayalam literary awards
1970 establishments in Kerala